Absecon Highlands is a census-designated place (CDP) in Atlantic County, New Jersey, United States. It is in the eastern part of the county, in southern Galloway Township. It is bordered to the south by the city of Absecon and to the east by Reeds Bay, a tidal water body the connects to the Atlantic Ocean through Broad Creek and Absecon Inlet. The CDP includes the neighborhoods of Absecon Highlands, Seaview Estates, Seaview Park, Conovertown, and Holly Brook.

U.S. Route 9 (New York Road) is the main road through the community; it leads north  to the Garden State Parkway in Port Republic and south through Absecon  to the Atlantic City Expressway in Pleasantville.

The community was first listed as a CDP prior to the 2020 census.

Demographics

References 

Census-designated places in Atlantic County, New Jersey
Census-designated places in New Jersey
Galloway Township, New Jersey